Aleksei Sergeyevich Sugak (born 27 February 1990) is a Russian former professional football player.

Club career
He made his Russian Premier League debut on 13 March 2010 for FC Rostov in a game against FC Tom Tomsk.

References

External links
 
 
 

1990 births
People from Azov
Living people
Russian footballers
Association football forwards
Russian expatriate footballers
Expatriate footballers in Belarus
Russian Premier League players
FC Rostov players
FC Neman Grodno players
FC SKA Rostov-on-Don players
FC Olimpia Volgograd players
FC Taganrog players
FC Khimki players
Sportspeople from Rostov Oblast